Rynárec is a municipality and village in Pelhřimov District in the Vysočina Region of the Czech Republic. It has about 600 inhabitants.

Notable people
Martin Hunal (born 1989), cyclist

References

Villages in Pelhřimov District